is a Japanese professional wrestler currently signed to New Japan Pro-Wrestling (NJPW).

Early life 
In March 2013, Uemura graduated from Imabari Technical High-school. He wrestled collegiately before he started his professional wrestling career. In October 2016, he won the 71 kg Greco-Roman championship of West Japan Collegiate Wrestling League. In March 2017, Uemura graduated from Fukuoka University.

Professional wrestling career 
In April 2017, after graduating from Fukuoka University, Uemura was signed to New Japan Pro-Wrestling under New Japan's "young lion" system. A year later, in April 2018, Uemura as well as fellow young lion, Yota Tsuji, made their pro-wrestling debuts at Lion's Gate Project 11 where Uemura was defeated by Ren Narita. On day one of Road to Wrestling Dontaku 2018, Uemura was defeated by Tetsuhiro Yagi. On day six, he was defeated by Tomoyuki Oka. On day eight, Uemura was defeated by Rocky Romero. On day 14, Uemura and Yuji Nagata were defeated by Oka and Shota Umino. On night two of Wrestling Dontaku 2018, Uemura teamed with Narita and Umino to be defeated by the team of veterans, Tiger Mask, Jushin Thunder Liger and Ryusuke Taguchi. At New Japan Road 2018, Uemura and Yota Tsuji wrestled to a time-limit draw. At Lion's Gate Project 12, Uemura and Tsuji once again wrestled to a time-limit draw. On day 6 of Best of the Super Juniors XXV, Uemura, Tsuji and Flip Gordon were defeated by Umino, Tiger Mask and Oka. On day 11, Uemura and Dragon Lee were defeated by Umino and Kushida. On day 12, Uemura, A. C. H. and Tsuji were defeated by Umino, Oka and Tiger Mask. Throughout Kizuna Road 2018, Tsuji and Uemura wrestled to time-limit draws. On September 8, Uemura teamed with Shota defeat Tsuji and Ren Narita to win his first match. In October 2019, Uemura teamed with Tiger Mask as part of the Super Junior Tag Tournament where they came in last place with zero points. Uemura competed in the 2020 New Japan Cup for the first time being eliminated by Yoshinobu Kanemaru in the first round. In November 2020, he entered the Best of the Super Juniors tournament. He finished the tournament with 0 wins and 9 losses, failing to advance to the finals. In 2022 Uemura travelled to the United States as part of his learning excursion where he began competing for New Japan Strong, All Elite Wrestling and Impact Wrestling. In August Uemura defeated Kenny King in his Impact Wrestling debut and the next month picked up his first win in New Japan Strong when he defeated veteran wrestler Christopher Daniels.

Championships and accomplishments

Collegiate wrestling 
West Japan Collegiate Wrestling League
71 kg Greco-Roman championship (2016)

Professional wrestling
Pro Wrestling Illustrated
Ranked No. 324 of the top 500 singles wrestlers in the PWI 500 in 2022

References

External links
 

Living people
Japanese male professional wrestlers
1994 births
People from Imabari, Ehime
Sportspeople from Ehime Prefecture
Fukuoka University alumni